Epacrophis is a genus of snakes in the family Leptotyphlopidae. All of the species were previously placed in the genus Leptotyphlops.

Species
The genus contains the following species:
 Epacrophis boulengeri, Manda flesh-pink blind snake, Lamu worm snake 
 Epacrophis drewesi, Drewes's worm snake 
 Epacrophis reticulatus, reticulate blind snake

References

 
Snake genera
Taxa named by Stephen Blair Hedges
Taxa named by William Roy Branch